Carriera is a surname. Notable people with the surname include:

Amalia Isabel Rodríguez Carriera (1924 – 2021), Cuban-Mexican dancer, actress and comedian
Rosalba Carriera (1673 – 1757), Venetian Rococo painter
Rosalba Carriera Peale (1799 – 1874), American portraitist, landscape painter, and lithographer

See also 

 Carrera (surname)

surnames